The Subscription Rooms is a building in George Street at the centre of the town of Stroud, Gloucestershire, England, erected in 1833 under the architect Charles Baker of Painswick. Funding for its erection was obtained through public subscription, hence its name, in the case of the Subscription Rooms it was a group of wealthy merchants.

The Rooms provide entertainment including music, dance, theatre, visual arts, spoken word, exhibitions and workshops. The Beatles performed there on 31 March 1962.

The two-storey, detached building is Grade II listed, giving it legal protection against unauthorised alteration or demolition. It is made from Cotswold stone, with a three-story extension to the rear, in brick. The frontage has a portico with Tuscan columns and balustraded balcony, facing onto a forecourt.

The building was owned by Stroud District Council but in 2019 passed into the ownership of the Stroud Subscription Rooms Trust (Charity No. 1180350). The forecourt is "owned" by the Subscription Rooms.

References

External links 

 
 Information on the Subscription Rooms review and 'expressions of interest' process, published by Stroud DC

Stroud
Grade II listed buildings in Gloucestershire